Jago Cooper (born 1 June 1977) is a British archaeologist. He is the Executive Director of the Sainsbury Centre and professor of Art and Archaeology at the University of East Anglia. Formerly, he was Curator of the Americas at the British Museum whose career has focused on the archaeology of South America and the Caribbean, in particular the historic effects of climate change on island communities. Since 2011 he has written and presented a series of programmes for BBC Four, including Lost Kingdoms of South America, Lost Kingdoms of Central America, Easter Island: Mysteries of a Lost World, Masters Of The Pacific Coast: The Tribes Of The American Northwest, and The Inca: Masters of the Clouds. He has also published books on world art and archaeology including,

Biography
Cooper attended Bryanston School in Dorset, and University College London (UCL) where he was awarded BA, MA and PhD qualifications in archaeology. After periods on the teaching staff at the University of Leicester and UCL, Cooper joined the British Museum's Department of Africa, Oceania and the Americas in 2012.

Cooper's archaeological work has focused on the pre-Columbian archaeology of the Americas, including major projects at El Chorro de Maíta and Los Buchillones in Cuba. He specialises in studying the historic effects of climate change in Caribbean island societies, most recently through examination of the cavescapes of Isla de Mona off Puerto Rico. In 2012 he released the book Surviving Sudden Environmental Change: Answers from Archaeology with Payson D. Sheets which was described as being one of the "outstanding examples of 'thinking big'. . . carefully researched, interdisciplinary, focused and informative" by Erika Guttmann-Bond in the Antiquity Journal.

In 2009 Cooper co-presented the Channel 4 series Man on Earth with Tony Robinson and Joy Singarayer, and in 2011 wrote and presented the series Lost Kingdoms of South America for BBC Four, including four episodes exploring the Chachapoya people, the city of Tiwanaku, the legend of El Dorado and the Kingdom of Chimor. A second series aired in September 2014 entitled Lost Kingdoms of Central America focusing on the Olmec, Chiriquí (Ngäbe) and Taíno people and the ancient Mexican city of Teotihuacan. In 2013 he filmed a one off-special for BBC 4 entitled Easter Island: Mysteries of a Lost World which re-examined the historic collapse in Rapa Nui society. January 2015 saw the broadcast of the two part series The Inca: Masters of the Clouds, also on BBC 4.

Curated Exhibitions 

 Peru: A Journey in Time. 11 November 2021 - 20 February 2022, British Museum - Marking Peru's bicentennial year of independence, this exhibition highlighted the history, beliefs and cultural achievements of the different peoples who lived here from around 2500 BC to the arrival of Europeans in the 1500s, and their legacy in the centuries that followed.
 Arctic: Culture and Climate. 22 October 2020 - 21 February 2021, British Museum -  "Developed in collaboration with Arctic communities, the exhibition celebrated the ingenuity and resilience of Arctic Peoples throughout history. It told the powerful story of respectful relationships with icy worlds and how Arctic Peoples have harnessed the weather and climate to thrive."
 Where the Thunderbird Lives: Cultural Resilience on the Northwest Coast of North America. 23 February - 27 August 2017, British Museum - "Where the Thunderbird lives celebrated the cultural resilience of First Nation communities on the Northwest Coast of North America. The exhibition aimed to bring the story of communities with more than 10,000 years of cultural continuity to an international audience at the British Museum."

Books
 Cooper, J. & Sheets, P. (eds). 2012 Surviving Sudden Environmental Change: Answers from Archaeology. University of Colorado Press, Boulder.
 Lincoln, A, Cooper, J. & Loovers, J. P. L. 2020 Arctic: Culture and Climate. Thames & Hudson [ISBN 978-05004-80663]
 Sunnucks, L. O. & Cooper, J. 2021 Mapping a New Museum. Routledge [ISBN 978-10004-12512]
 Pardo, C. & Cooper, J. (eds). 2021 Peru: a journey in time. British Museum Press, London, UK [ISBN 978-07141-24919]

References

External links 
 British Museum – Jago Cooper
 Jago Cooper, British Museum at Academia.edu
 

Alumni of the UCL Institute of Archaeology
Employees of the British Museum
English archaeologists
Living people
1977 births
People educated at Bryanston School
Pacific archaeology